Bodíky   is a village and municipality in the Dunajská Streda District in the Trnava Region of south-west Slovakia.

It has a public water-supply system and sewage system connected to sewage disposal plant. There is a football playground and a public library in the village.

History 
Until the end of World War I, it was part of Hungary. In the 15th century, the village belonged to the Pressburg Castle. After the 17th century the Amadé, Kánya, Cseszneky and Pálffy families were the most important land-owners in the village.

The village administratively fell within the Dunaszerdahely district of Pozsony County in the Kingdom of Hungary. After the Austro-Hungarian army disintegrated in November 1918, Czechoslovakian troops occupied the area. Under the Treaty of Trianon of 1920, it became officially part of Czechoslovakia and fell within Bratislava County until 1927. In November 1938, the First Vienna Award granted the area to Hungary and it was held by Hungary until 1945. After Soviet occupation in 1945, Czechoslovakian administration returned and the village became officially part of Czechoslovakia by the Paris Peace Treaties in 1947.

See also
 List of municipalities and towns in Slovakia

References

Genealogical resources

The records for genealogical research are available at the state archive "Štátny Archív in Bratislava, Slovakia"
 Roman Catholic church records (births/marriages/deaths): 1676-1912 (parish B)
 Lutheran church records (births/marriages/deaths): 1823-1946 (parish B)
 Reformated church records (births/marriages/deaths): 1823-1946 (parish B)

External links
Surnames of living people in Bodiky

Villages and municipalities in Dunajská Streda District
Hungarian communities in Slovakia